Thaddeus Asa Tillotson, Jr. (December 20, 1940 – May 16, 2012) was a relief pitcher in Major League Baseball pitcher. Listed at 6' 2", 195 lb., Tillotson batted and threw right handed. He was born in Merced, California.

Tillotson was originally signed by the Los Angeles Dodgers as an amateur free agent in 1960. In 50 career games, he had a 4–9 record with a 4.06 earned run average.

References

External links

Alt.Obituaries.com

Major League Baseball pitchers
New York Yankees players
Albuquerque Dukes players
Atlanta Crackers players
Macon Dodgers players
Nankai Hawks players
Reno Silver Sox players
Spokane Indians players
Syracuse Chiefs players
American expatriate baseball players in Japan
Baseball players from California
People from Merced, California
1940 births
2012 deaths
Fresno City Rams baseball players